Family First New Zealand is a conservative Christian lobby group in New Zealand. It was founded in March 2006 by former Radio Rhema talkback radio host and South Auckland social-worker Bob McCoskrie who continues to be its National Director. Its 2006 stated objectives were to "seek to influence public policy affecting the rights and protection of families and promote a culture that values the family". In 2009 Victoria University religious studies professor Paul Morris said Family First was "successfully broadening the Christian agenda in New Zealand politics in a way never seen before". In 2020 Family First was described as "New Zealand's most formidable conservative campaigners". Family First was established by a trust deed under the Charitable Trusts Act 1957 in 2006, was registered as a charity in 2007 and deregistered in 2022.

Focus 
In July 2022, the organisation listed the following areas of focus:

Research and education
Family First’s purposes and aims are:
to promote and advance research and policy regarding family and marriage
to participate in social analysis and debate on issues relating to and affecting the family
to educate the public in their understanding of the institutional, legal and moral framework that makes a just and democratic society possible
to produce and publish relevant and stimulating material in newspapers, magazines, and other media relating to issues affecting families
to speak up about issues relating to families that are in the public domain

Speaking up and public debate 
Family First has been a pro-family voice on a number of major public-policy debates in New Zealand. These include:
 the anti-smacking law
 the redefinition of marriage
 the liberalisation of the abortion law
 the recent cannabis and euthanasia referendums

Family matters 
Family First says "New Zealand needs a voice that can research and advocate for strong families and safe communities".

History

Anti-smacking referendum
In 2007, Family First supported a petition for a citizens-initiated referendum to overturn the 2007 amendment act which replaced Section 59 of the Crimes Act 1961, which had allowed for a defence of reasonable force in child abuse cases based on corporal punishment. The petition gained 324,316 signatures although only 285,027 were required for a referendum.  When checked for invalid signatures there was a shortfall of 15,000 signatures. Sufficient signatures were then obtained to hold the 2009 New Zealand citizens-initiated referendum, asking voters "Should a smack as part of good parental correction be a criminal offence in New Zealand?". In May 2009, Family First criticised the Government for spending $8 million on the referendum, rather than including it in the 2008 General Election, and suggested they simply amend the law. Although the referendum returned with 87.4% voting "No", no change was made to the Crimes Act.

Pornography 
In 2010, after Labour MP Shane Jones controversially admitted to using his ministerial credit card for pornographic movies, Family First wrote about the damaging effects of pornography on families and marriages, and promoted research showing negative effects of children being exposed to pornography.

In 2017, Family First presented a 22,000 written signature petition to Parliament against pornography, promoted research showing the harmful effects of porn being a public health issue, and called for an investigation into the destructive affects of pornography. The media reported that the petition even had the support of "outspoken left-wing feminist parliamentarians".

Electoral campaigning
Family First has produced "Value Your Vote", a brochure and accompanying website which were voting guides primarily concerned with each party's or candidate's record and opinions on issues which it saw affecting the family, such as civil unions, same-sex marriage,  prostitution, brothels, abortion, unborn child rights, embryonic stem cell research, anti-smacking, gender identity, abstinence-based sex education, parental notification, palliative care, public indecency, drinking age, alcohol outlets, Easter trading, loan sharks, gambling, welfare vouchers, affordable housing,  GST on rates, facilities for families, paid parental leave, assisted suicide and euthanasia, medicinal and recreational cannabis and decriminalisation of all drugs.

The guides were published for the 2008 general election, the 2010 Auckland mayoral election, the 2011 general election, the 2013 Auckland mayoral election, the 2014 general election, the 2017 general election and the 2020 general election.

Same-sex marriage
In July 2012, Family First established "Protect Marriage", a website set up to oppose the legal recognition of same-sex marriage in New Zealand after Louisa Wall's private member's bill was drawn from the ballot. In January 2013, Family First presented a petition with 72,000 signatures to Parliament opposing the redefinition of marriage. A poll just before the bill was passed showed that the country was split over the issue.

Charitable status
In May 2013, the independent Charities Registration Board determined the group did not "further religion or education, nor promote a benefit to all New Zealanders" and held that Family First did not qualify for charitable status. In its media statement and within the online copy of its decision, the Charities Registration Board held that Family First's objectives were primarily political and not the provision of social, educational or other charitable services as defined under the Charities Act 2005.

National Director Bob McCoskrie challenged the decision, saying it was a ploy to "shut them up". It also mentioned other charities that have challenged its stance on the abolition of parental corporal punishment, LGBT rights in New Zealand and other civil liberties and human rights issues, questioning their charitable entitlements. He expressed concern about the organisation's future if the deregistration decision remained in place, stating: "No longer will we be exempt from income tax and donations to Family First will no longer qualify for the donation rebate. This is despite it being a non-profit organisation funded purely by donation and gifts and relying heavily on volunteer time"  McCoskrie's concern was questioned by some critics of his organisation, given that Family First New Zealand listed the multinational religious right organisation World Congress of Families as one of the supporters for its "Forum on the Family 2012".

On 22 June 2015, Family First appealed the Charity Registration Board's decision to deregister it in 2013. The group argued that their opposition to same-sex marriage had been the reason for their loss of charity status. The Charities Registration Board argued that Family First's main purpose was to promote a particularly point of view of family life and contended that the group did not advance religion or education, nor provide a benefit to all New Zealanders as required by the law. On 30 June 2015, the High Court directed the Charities Registration Board to reconsider the case in the light of a recent Supreme Court charities decision about Greenpeace. This development was welcomed by McCoskrie as a victory for charities that advocate for difference causes in the context of an earlier landmark Supreme Court decision which recognised Greenpeace's political advocacy as a charitable act.

On 21 August 2017, the Charities Registration Board released its reconsideration and again decided that Family First did not qualify for charitable status on the grounds that the group's promotion of its views on marriage and traditional family could not be classified as being charitable for the public benefit. In response, McCroskie announced that Family First would be appealing the board's decision in court. On 30 April 2018, the High Court in Wellington heard Family First's second appeal against the Charities Registration Board's decision to remove its charitable status. On 7 September 2018, the Wellington High Court upheld the Charity Board's decision to strip Family First of its charitable status.

On 27 August 2020, the Court of Appeal overturned the Charities Registration Board's 2017 decision to revoke Family First's charitable status. McCroskie welcomed the Court of Appeal's decision as a victory for their freedom to advocate on behalf of their supporters in civil society. In mid December 2020, the Attorney General, Labour MP David Parker, appealed the Court of Appeal's ruling to the Supreme Court.

On 28 June 2022 the Supreme Court ruled that Family First did not qualify for charitable status, concluding that its research lacked the balance needed to be educational. The Supreme Court also held that Family First's conservative family advocacy was not charitable on the grounds that it lacked "fairness, balance, and respect." Family First executive McCroskie condemned the Supreme Court's ruling as an attack on free speech and denounced the revocation of Family First's charitable status as a "witch hunt." While charities researcher Dr Michael Gousmett welcomed the Supreme Court's ruling on the grounds that Family First discriminated against some people, Charities Law director Sue Barker expressed concern that the revocation of Family First's charitable status could set a precedent for targeting charities with dissenting views. Barker also called on the New Zealand Government to clearly define charitable purposes as part of their review of the Charities Act. Before forming a Government in October 2017, both New Zealand Labour and Green parties had said they would reform the Act by "updating and widening rather than narrowing the definition of charitable purposes" so that NGOs would be "encouraged rather than penalised for their advocacy". The bill to revise the act is expected to be introduced in 2022.

Into the River
On 6 September 2015, Family First successfully appealed a decision by New Zealand's classification office to lift an R14 restriction on the New Zealand author Ted Dawe's Into the River, a young adult novel about a Māori youth named Te Arepa Santos' experiences at an Auckland boarding school. Since its publication in 2012, Into the River had drawn controversy for its explicit description of sex, drugs, and coarse language. As a result of the appeal, the book was placed under an interim restriction order under New Zealand's Films, Videos and Publications Classification Act 1993, banning it completely from being sold or supplied in New Zealand. This was the first time a book had been banned in New Zealand in 22 years. News of the ban was also reported by several foreign media outlets.

Family First's actions were criticised by Ted Dawe, the book's publisher Penguin Random House, the poet C. K. Stead, and several librarians as amounting to censorship. In response to public criticism, the organisation's National Director McCroskie asserted that his organisation had not called for the book to be banned but had merely wanted censors to reinstate the book's R14 rating and require that copies of the book carry a warning sticker. In addition, McCroskie also called for a wider film-like sticker rating system for books citing parental concerns and age appropriateness. Family First also claimed that the Classification Office had received 400 letters about the book from concerned parents. In a press statement, Family First also argued that the New Zealand Bill of Rights stated that "freedom of expression" and "freedom to access information" did not trump censorship laws aimed at protecting the "public good".

On 14 October 2015, the Film and Literature Board lifted the interim ban on Into the River; ruling by a majority that while aspects of the book were offensive it did not merit an age restriction. In response, McCroskie accused the board of succumbing to book industry pressure despite what he alleged was the book's "highly offensive and gratuitous language, adult themes and graphic sexual content".

Ask Me First
In 2017, Family First launched a campaign called "AskMeFirst" to stop people born male that identify as female, or transgender women, using female-only facilities like toilets and changing rooms. Family First drew media attention when it released a video entitled "Ask Me First About School Toilet Privacy: Laura" which focused on a high school girl and her mother's opposition to a transgender student using the female toilets at her school. Tranzaction spokesperson Linda Whitehead and RainbowYouth spokesperson Toni Duder criticised Family First for promoting transphobia.

Sex or gender self-identification
In 2018, Family First objected to the New Zealand Government's proposal to ease the process for changing one's gender on their birth certificate. While applicants wanting to change the gender on their birth certificate then had to go through a lengthy process in the Family Court, the Government proposed a simple statutory declaration. Family First Director McCoskrie claimed that changing birth certificates would promote unscientific gender ideology and tell medical professionals "that they got it wrong at time of birth." In 2021, the Births, Deaths, Marriages, and Relationships Registration Act 2021 became law and allows people to change the sex or gender on their birth certificates without having to physically change their sex. It also allows the guardian of a child under 16 to change their child's nominated sex, and 16 or 17-year olds to change their nominated sex by statutory declaration without the consent of their legal guardian.

Abortion law reform
In 2019, Family First opposed the Labour-led coalition government's new legislation to remove abortion from the Crimes Act 1961, to allow unrestricted access to abortion for the first 20 weeks of pregnancy and restricted access after 20 weeks. The group described the government's proposed legislation as "deeply anti-human rights." In March 2020 the Abortion Legislation Act 2020 decriminalised abortion and allows women to choose a termination up to 20 weeks into a pregnancy, and terminate after 20 weeks with approval of a qualified health professional. In 2022, after the US Supreme Court repealed long-standing Supreme Court decision Roe vs Wade that guaranteed nationwide access to abortion, Family First said the pro-life movement would continue to push future governments to restrict abortion in New Zealand and that the US decision was a "huge encouragement" for anti-abortion activists.

Euthanasia and cannabis referendums
During the New Zealand general election 2020, separate referendums were held to decide whether or not to legalise euthanasia in New Zealand and recreational cannabis in New Zealand. The results were mixed. While Family First and other opponents were defeated when 65.1 percent of voters ratified the passage of the End of Life Choice Act 2019, Family First and other opponents won when 50.71 percent of voters rejected the legalisation of recreational cannabis. Family First director McCoskrie of the "Say Nope to Dope" campaign said that he was "pretty stoked" with the cannabis referendum results and that New Zealanders "understood the perceived benefits of legalisaiton were not greater than the harms that were going to come on society". Aaron Ironside, spokesperson for the SAM (Smart Approaches to Marijuana) NZ Coalition, that included Family First and other Christian, Muslim and secular groups, said that he was happy that New Zealand younger people would not be enlisted in a "social experiment." 

After the referendums, Family First research showing the media bias in favour of the legalisation of recreational cannabis, was reported by NewstalkZB radio broadcaster Mike Hosking saying "36 percent of all headlines promoted yes, 18 percent were for no. In other words, twice as much of what you saw was for one camp." Similarly figures on the number of reported quotes from advocates showed "the yes position was quoted twice as often as no". Hosking said "worst offenders were The Spinoff, Stuff, Newshub, the Herald, TVNZ, and Radio New Zealand" and that he thought TVNZ & RNZ had "a statutory obligation to be fair and balanced".

References

External links
Family First New Zealand

Organizations established in 2006
2006 establishments in New Zealand
Religious organisations based in New Zealand
Christian political organizations
Conservatism in New Zealand
Anti-abortion organisations in New Zealand
Lobbying organisations in New Zealand
Opposition to cannabis legalization
Opposition to same-sex marriage
Political advocacy groups in New Zealand